Ceratiosicyos is a genus of flowering plants belonging to the family Achariaceae.

Its native range is Southern Africa.

Species:
 Ceratiosicyos laevis (Thunb.) A.Meeuse

References

Achariaceae
Malpighiales genera